Nathaniel Lofthouse  (27 August 1925 – 15 January 2011) was an English professional footballer who played as a forward for Bolton Wanderers for his entire career. He won 33 caps for England between 1950 and 1958, scoring 30 goals, with one of the highest goals-per-game ratios of any England player.

Playing career

Born in Bolton, Lancashire, in 1925, Lofthouse joined the town's main club on 4 September 1939 and made his debut in a wartime 5–1 win against Bury on 22 March 1941 when he scored two goals. It was then more than five years until he made his league debut for the club, but he eventually played against Chelsea on 31 August 1946, when he scored twice in a 4–3 defeat. Lofthouse would go on to play 33 games for England, but his debut on 22 November 1950 made him 25 when he finally broke into the team. He perhaps justified a claim to an earlier call-up by scoring both goals in a 2–2 draw against Yugoslavia at Highbury on his debut.

On 25 May 1952, Lofthouse earned the title 'Lion of Vienna' after scoring his second goal in England's 3–2 victory over Austria. In doing so he was elbowed in the face, tackled from behind, and finally brought down by the goalkeeper. Back from national team duty, he then scored six goals in a game for the Football League against the Irish League on 24 September 1952.

In 1952–53, he was named FWA Footballer of the Year. He scored a goal – but was on the losing side – in the famous 1953 FA Cup Final (aka 'The Matthews Final'), having previously scored in each round. That season he topped the First Division goalscoring charts with 30 goals. He featured in the 1954 World Cup side. Lofthouse scored twice against Belgium in a match that ended 4–4. Injured for the next match, in the quarter final game against Uruguay he equalized in the 16th minute, after receiving the ball in the 18-yard box.

On 3 May 1958, almost five years to the day after losing the 1953 final, Lofthouse captained Bolton in the 1958 FA Cup Final against Manchester United.
 There was a national wave of sympathy for United, who three months earlier had suffered grievously in the Munich air disaster. Bolton won the game 2–0 with Lofthouse scoring both goals, the second of which was highly controversial and remains a talking point to this day. Lofthouse went into a challenge with the United keeper Harry Gregg and barged him into the net to score. Shoulder charging the goalkeeper was a legitimate tactic at the time, but Lofthouse later admitted that his challenge was a foul.

On 26 November 1958, Lofthouse made his final England appearance, against Wales, at the age of 33, and he officially retired from the game in January 1960 because of an ankle injury, although his final league game was not until 17 December of that year, when he suffered a knee injury against Birmingham City. Lofthouse stands eighth in the list of English football's top division all time goalscorers.

Coaching and managerial career
After retiring from playing football, Lofthouse became the assistant trainer at Burnden Park on 10 July 1961 and was then appointed chief coach at the club in 1967. In 1968, he spent a brief time as caretaker manager of the club and took over the job full-time on 18 December. Before becoming Bolton's chief scout, he became an administrative manager at Burnden. In 1978, he became the club's executive manager. In 1985, at the age of 60, Lofthouse became caretaker manager at the club again and became president in 1986.

Recognition
Lofthouse was the recipient of various honours after retiring from the game. On 2 December 1989, he was made a Freeman of Bolton. On 1 January 1994, he was appointed an OBE and on 18 January 1997, Bolton decided to name their East Stand at their new Reebok Stadium after him. On 24 August 2013, a statue was dedicated.

On 7 April 1993, he appeared as a special guest on the TV guest show This Is Your Life, in which the on-screen guests included Tom Finney and Harry Gregg, while others including Bobby Charlton, Gary Lineker and Ian Rush appeared on screen to pay tribute to Lofthouse as they were unable to appear alongside Lofthouse due to other commitments.

Tributes were paid to Lofthouse as he celebrated his 80th birthday, including a party at the Reebok. A campaign, backed by Gordon Taylor, the chief executive of the Professional Footballers' Association and former Bolton player, was started, aiming to get Lofthouse knighted. Nat Lofthouse was an Inaugural Inductee into the English Football Hall of Fame in 2002.

Personal life

Already a Bolton Wanderers player having joined them in 1939 Lofthouse was conscripted in 1943 and worked in Mosley Common colliery as a Bevin Boy. He married Alma Foster in 1947 and they remained married until her death in 1985. They had two children, a son, Jeff, and a daughter, Vivien.

Death
Lofthouse died on 15 January 2011, aged 85, in a nursing home in Bolton. He had suffered with dementia.
On 24 January 2011 in Bolton Wanderers first home game since his death against Chelsea, a pre-match period of a minute's silence, thunderous applause, black-and-white footage of Lofthouse in action and the laying of floral tributes by Kevin Davies and John Terry took place before the start of the match.
Lofthouse was buried on 26 January 2011 as thousands turned out to say goodbye at Bolton Parish Church. His funeral service was attended by more than 500 invited guests and members of the public. Eulogies were offered by Bolton chairman Phil Gartside and Professional Footballers' Association chief executive Gordon Taylor, a boyhood Bolton fan and former Wanderers player.
Former Bolton captain Kevin Davies and then manager Owen Coyle were among the pallbearers.

Legacy

Soon after Lofthouse's death a swell of support for a statue to be built in his memory started. A year to the day after his death, Bolton Wanderers chairman Phil Gartside announced plans for one to be built and for the statue to be situated outside the Reebok Stadium. The plan was for the statue to be funded by public donations, with help from the club. It was unveiled on 24 August 2013, three days before what would have been Lofthouse's 88th birthday. It was originally scheduled to take place three days later on his birthday but the date was moved forward to coincide with Bolton's home fixture against Queens Park Rangers.

In April 1998, train operator Virgin CrossCountry named locomotive 47807 Lion of Vienna in Lofthouse's honour at Bolton station.

Career statistics

International goals
Scores and results list England's goal tally first, score column indicates score after each Lofthouse goal.

Honours

Player
Bolton Wanderers
Football League War Cup: 1944–45
FA Cup: 1957–58; runner-up: 1952–53
FA Charity Shield: 1958

Individual
FWA Footballer of the Year: 1952–53

References

External links
'The Cup Comes Home' - 1958 newsreel of Nat Lofthouse in Bolton, Lancashire
The FA England Profile
Daily Telegraph Obituary
Guardian Obituary
BBC Obituary

1925 births
2011 deaths
Bevin Boys
Footballers from Bolton
English footballers
Association football forwards
Bolton Wanderers F.C. players
English Football League players
Outfield association footballers who played in goal
English Football League representative players
First Division/Premier League top scorers
English Football Hall of Fame inductees
England international footballers
1954 FIFA World Cup players
English football managers
Bolton Wanderers F.C. managers
Officers of the Order of the British Empire
People with dementia
FA Cup Final players